Selene Gallio is a supervillain appearing in American comic books published by Marvel Comics. As a mutant and an enemy of the X-Men, she is often associated with the Hellfire Club's Inner Circle.

Selene was portrayed by Kota Eberhardt in the 20th Century Fox X-Men film Dark Phoenix (2019). A character based on the Marvel Comics character was previously portrayed by Kate Beckinsale in the Sony Pictures Underworld film series (2003–2016).

Publication history

Selene first appeared in New Mutants #9 (November 1983), written by Chris Claremont and illustrated by Sal Buscema.

Fictional character biography
Selene is the oldest known human mutant. Functionally immortal, her millennia-long life is attributed to her ability to drain the life essence from other beings to extend her own existence indefinitely. Her name derives from the ancient lunar goddess Selene, daughter of the Titans Hyperion and Theia. Claiming to have already been old when modern mankind was just emerging, Selene was born over 17,000 years ago, somewhere in what is now Central Europe, "after the Oceans swallowed Atlantis and before the rise of the Aryas". Her tribe's elders recognized her for what she was and commanded the entire tribe, including her own mother, to sacrifice their lives to feed her.

Hyborian Age
Selene was revealed to have been an old enemy of the sorcerer Kulan Gath. Kulan Gath was active during the Hyborian Age (before any recorded civilizations) and is known to have faced both Conan the Barbarian and Red Sonja. In fact, Sonja reportedly managed to kill him and his spirit would not manifest again until the modern era. Thus, Selene was active at least as early as the Hyborian age.

Rome and Eliphas
Selene came to reside in Rome during the height of its empire. She approached Eliphas, a well-respected senator whose wife had left for a general named Mascius. Selene offered Eliphas immortality in exchange for helping her kill and absorb every soul in Rome. Eliphas went about drawing pentagrams and performing rituals at several locations in the city, but warned a small girl to get her family out. The girl's father alerted the authorities and Eliphas and Selene were captured before the spell could be carried out. Just before they were burned at the stake Selene killed the guards. She then cursed Eliphas for the perceived betrayal with an eternal life of torture, transforming the latter into a vampire-like creature. Eliphas was buried alive for 700 years until being discovered by a farmer in a field.

Nova Roma
In relatively recent times, Selene was trapped for centuries in the Amazon in the Romanesque town of Nova Roma. She was worshipped as a goddess and worked to maintain the isolation of the town so she could maintain control. Eli Bard finally locates Selene in Nova Roma. Still in love with her despite her curse, Bard realizes of having to make an offering to her before approaching her. She also was able to marry several times and have descendants, including Amara Aquilla. Her most recent known husband was Marcus Domitius Gallio, a senator of Nova Roma.

In Nova Roma, Selene attempted to kill Amara Aquilla. She knocked Amara into a lava pool, thereby releasing the latter's latent mutant powers as Magma.  Selene fought and defeated Magma, and plotted to turn Danielle Moonstar into a psychic vampire like herself and conquer the world. Selene fought the New Mutants, and was cast into lava and buried alive.

Becoming the Black Queen
Selene directed her worshippers to undertake tasks that eventually allowed her to leave Nova Roma. She made her way to New York City, where she encountered Juggernaut at a bar. Selene planned to seduce and murder Juggernaut, but was prevented when Wolverine manipulated a bar-room brawl between Juggernaut and Colossus. She then discovered the existence of Rachel Summers, whom she sought to turn into a slave only to be defeated by the X-Men. Prior to the X-Men saving Rachel, Selene had tracked Rachel down to the home of a young man named Nicholas Damiano who had let the homeless Rachel spend the night. Selene savagely murdered the young man, resulting in Rachel swearing revenge against Selene.

With help from Friedrich Von Roehm (one of her worshippers), Selene made contact with the Hellfire Club and forced the group to take her on as the new Black Queen. She became critical in the X-Men's attempt to stop Kulan Gath, after he conquered New York City with a reality-altering spell though she ultimately attempted to double-cross the X-Men in order to steal Gath's talisman of power.

Selene's time with the Hellfire Club was a turbulent time, due to her contempt for Sebastian Shaw and quite open desire to rule the Hellfire Club as its sole leader. This led Shaw and Emma Frost to conspire to kill Selene by manipulating and training the young mutant Firestar to assassinate her. This failed when Firestar realized their plan.

Selene and the Hellfire Club's relationship with the X-Men came to a head with Rachel making an unauthorized assassination attempt on Selene.  Wolverine felt honor-bound to prevent Rachel from being a murderer, and so, saved Selene's life by severely injuring Rachel.  Selene herself was enraged, and used the incident to force the Lords Cardinal to agree to hunt and kill Rachel. A battle over this issue immediately commenced between the X-Men and Lords Cardinal, but it was unexpectedly halted when it drew the attention of Nimrod, the super-sentinel who had murdered Selene's assistant Rhoem, and was as bent on killing the X-Men and the Lords Cardinal. The Lords Cardinal and the X-Men hastily agreed to a truce, fighting well-enough to cause Nimrod to flee.

After this battle, in the pages of New Mutants, much was made about Selene having secret plans involving Nova Roma and Magma. Due to a love for Empath, Magma left the New Mutants to join the Hellions, only to be called home by her father to enter into an arranged marriage with a resident there. Magma's escort back home to Nova Roma turned out to be Empath who ultimately decided to stay in the city with her. The two became lovers and Magma was freed from her arranged marriage plans so that she could be with him. Writer changes and the book's transition into X-Force caused the storyline to be aborted. Furthermore, it was revealed in New Warriors #31, via Empath, that Nova Roma was nothing more than an elaborate lie, concocted by Selene several decades prior. In a desperate bid to relive happier days in which she lived in ancient Rome, Selene arranged for hundreds of people to be kidnapped and taken to the jungles of the Amazon, to a city constructed per her designs. There she was somehow able to utterly brainwash her prisoners to believe themselves descendants of ancient Romans living in the Amazon. Magma was one of these kidnapped and brainwashed souls, according to Empath. The city was disbanded and the residents returned to their regular lives across the globe.

Years later, due to Chris Claremont wishing to undo writer Fabian Nieciza's dismantling of the concept of Nova Roma, Claremont ignored said story and wrote Magma as originally, and later had Magma make cryptic references to having been manipulated into believing Nova Roma was a lie by parties unknown that sought to hurt Magma. Furthermore, the five-issue mini-series "New Mutants Forever" revealed that Claremont originally planned on revealing Magma to be Selene's granddaughter. This family connection would be stated as well (with no build-up) in New Mutants Vol 3 #6-8, which had Selene resurrect Magma's teammate Cypher to try to kill Magma. Furthermore, it was strongly implied during "Necrosha" that Shaw and Emma Frost manipulated the Empath/Magma relationship in order to get Empath inside Nova Roma. In the event that Selene struck first and eliminated both, Empath's powers would then be used to dismantle the city via convincing the residents that their lives were lies concocted by Selene.

Selene ultimately was the deciding vote to vote Shaw out of the Hellfire Club, when tension between Shaw and the newly recruited White King Magneto came to blows. Unknown to Magneto or Frost, however, Selene had decided that she no longer had any need for the Hellfire Club and began plotting its destruction by gathering an army of young mutants, with help from the mutant omnipath known as the Gamesmaster. Under her authority, the Upstarts engaged in a killing spree that led to many presumed deaths (Magneto, Sebastian Shaw, Donald Pierce, and the Reavers), mortal injuries (Emma Frost), and outright deaths (the Hellions). Selene manipulated her young followers with the promise of a game, where each murder committed would land them points that would ultimately lead to them being granted a prize, described as "being the next best thing to immortality" by the Gamemaster. However (with another writer change), Selene's involvement with the Upstarts was cut short as she herself was betrayed by Trevor Fitzroy. Selene was kept in a torture device that repeatedly ripped her flesh from her body (to attract the attention of the Gamesmaster who took advantage of the situation as the Upstarts' new leader). She would be freed by Amanda Sefton, though the torture left her weak and scarred.

Needing to replenish her power, Selene first attacked and killed the other surviving Externals. Though she was opposed by X-Force, she managed to complete the slaughter and knock out the mutants, until Cable arrived. Selene's attempt to absorb Cable's life backfired when she touched his techno-organic arm and she was forced to flee to maintain her power. Shortly afterwards, she tried to access the power of a mystical convergence using a Runestaff made from the roots of Yggdrasil, the Norse World Tree. She came to the Exploding Colossal Man festival in New Mexico, but was again opposed by X-Force, who managed to wrest the Runestaff away from her and destroy the Colossal Man mannequin it activated. Selene missed her opportunity for ultimate power and vowed vengeance on X-Force.

She next appeared back in Brazil, where she had tracked Sunspot, along with Deviants posing as S.H.I.E.L.D. agents. She lured Sunspot to her defense, and offered the latter a position of power in the Hellfire Club, which the man refused, regardless of the illusions with which she tempted. However, Sunspot went along with Selene to stop the Deviants in the Damocles Foundation from activating a Celestial Gatherer. Selene herself was attacked by the Sword strike team, but she managed to cast a spell that devolved them back to lizards. Along with the rest of X-Force, Selene was able to usurp control of the machinery that activated the Gatherer, but Moonstar and Arcadia destroyed the Celestial artifact before Selene could access its power.

Selene then returned to her post as the Black Queen of the Hellfire Club, after striking a deal with the demon Blackheart and seemingly throwing out the rest of the Inner Circle. She offered Sunspot the position of Black Rook, which the latter initially refused but then accepted when Selene and Blackheart revealed that doing so would allow them to resurrect the spirit of Juliana Sandoval, the girl who died saving Sunspot's life when the latter first joined the New Mutants. Sunspot had no choice to accept and become Selene's protégé.

But with Shaw's return to the Hellfire Club, Selene was somehow trapped inside the catacombs under the Hellfire Club. However, she gained limited mobility from an alliance with Donald Pierce. When the X-Men, including Rachel arrived, during a membership change in the Hellfire Club, Selene plotted to use Rachel to completely free herself. She followed Rachel to Hong Kong via a transport portal and saved the female from being corrupted by a telepathic agent of Courtney Ross who was trying to become the next White Queen. This move was only a prelude to Selene taking over Rachel's mind, but Marvel Girl was too strong for Selene and expelled her, keeping Selene trapped for a time beneath the Hellfire Club headquarters.

After M-Day
Selene was one of the few mutants to retain her powers after the events of M-Day.

Selene (disguised as an old woman) befriends Wither and they live together in Mutant Town. She encourages him to use his powers and not be afraid of his natural gifts. She then asks him if he would use his powers to save his or her life. She had been killing a large number of people by draining their life-forces, and during her last feeding her disguise was spotted by a witness. She reveals to Wither that Laurie has died, while he was away. Later she is attacked by the police and managed to kill two of them before being shot multiple times. Wither arrives and kills the other two officers, only for Selene to drop her disguise, telling him she is immortal and that they are two of a kind and should be together. She tells Wither that she will be his queen if he agrees, then kisses him, and he consents.

Eli Bard's offering
Selene's relationship with Eli Bard is explained by Warpath to the other members of X-Force. It is revealed he had originally planned to sacrifice the Purifiers to Selene but changed his plans upon seeing Bastion reprogram an offspring of Magus. Using the Technarch transmode virus he reanimated the corpses in the burial grounds of the Apache tribe that he had decimated decades earlier along with Caliban. He presented them to Selene for the purpose of finding other dead mutants and resurrecting them by the same means, so that Bard can sacrifice them and their powers to her.

Necrosha

One week before the event of Necrosha, Selene has the recently resurrected Destiny brought before her where she asks what her future holds.

Selene returns to the place of her birth in central Europe, accompanied by a new Inner Circle, consisting of Blink, Senyaka, Mortis, Wither, and Eli Bard. She sets her plan into motion of becoming a goddess with the Inner Circle; they go to the New York branch of the Hellfire Club, where they slaughter everyone present.  Selene then targets others who she feels have obstructed, or otherwise failed, her in her quest for divinity, namely Shaw, Pierce, Frost (against whom she especially holds a grudge because of Frost's use of the "Black Queen" codename when working for the Dark X-Men), the X-Men, and Magma. Caliban and Thunderbird then lead her to the ruins of Genosha which are dubbed "Necrosha" by Selene and swears that her journey will end here. While most of the resurrected mutants attack the X-Men and Utopia, Selene is seen with Bard resurrecting the massacred residents of Genosha, with Cerebro detecting the rise of mutant numbers in millions (the first life-signs detected by Bastion's computers include Spoor, Katu, Unus, REM-RAM, Static, and Barnacle). There is a major problem though: a lot of the deceased have been depowered, despite having been killed BEFORE M-day. Wither and Mortis explain what happened and the Coven begins to set up base at Necrosha. It turns out that Selene can't do the ritual yet, because Bard lost the knife that was required to do it. She then dispatches her crew and they end up taking the knife back, capturing Warpath in the process. Once Bard gives Selene the knife and proclaims eternal love for her, Selene stabs Eli, killing the latter (much to Wither's delight). Warpath is eventually rescued by the Vanisher but Selene absorbs the many souls around her, turning light blue and growing in size. She finally becomes the goddess she had sought to be for so long. Turning to her followers, she commands them to get her more souls. Warpath was able to destroy Selene by plunging his dagger into her chest, after teaching X-Force the Ghost Dance, a ritual meant to kill evil spirits such as Selene. Shocked that her moment of godhood was taken away so quickly, Selene explodes into rays of light.

Sometime after Selene's death, Blink attempted to resurrect the Black Queen. Blink was eventually stopped by Frost and a small team of X-Men (consisting of Blindfold, Pixie, Husk, Warpath) along with former Sorcerer Supreme Doctor Strange who managed successfully to purge Blink of Selene's corrupted influence.

Return
It was later revealed that Selene's body and soul had been preserved as airborne particles and somehow stored in stasis in a vault located somewhere in New York City. Lady Deathstrike and the Enchantress gained access to the vault and through the newly enhanced magic granted to her by the sentient virus, Arkea, she was able to fully restore Selene to physical life for the purpose of adding her to the newly formed Sisterhood of Mutants.

Power Elite
In the aftermath of the "Secret Empire", Selene has publicly become head of the White House's "Task Force of Faith-Based Initiatives", and joined the "Power Elite", an alliance of powerful people including Thunderbolt Ross, Baron von Strucker, and Alexa Lukin. She also assisted in the resurrection of Aleksander Lukin but also revived a remnant of the Red Skull's mind.

"Dawn of X"
In the "House of X" storyline, Selene, along with other villainous and fractious mutants, is welcomed to the new mutant island nation of Krakoa, which has been created by Professor X, Magneto and Moira MacTaggart, in order to heal mutantdom and start over as a whole species together. In a storyline in X-Men (vol. 5), Selene and Emplate have been tasked by Xavier with measuring the amount of psychic energy that Krakoa would take from its inhabitants. A similar protocol is put in place for them both as they also need to nourish on mutants for survival.

Powers and abilities
Selene is both a mutant and a powerful sorceress who is immortal. She possesses a wide range of superhuman abilities, but it has never been clearly defined which of these are her actual mutant abilities and which are skills derived from magic or other sources.

Selene is a "psychic vampire" with the ability to sustain herself by psionically draining the life force of other human beings into herself. If she drains a person's entire life force, the victim dies and crumbles to dust in seconds. If Selene only drains the victim's life force partially, she achieves a measure of psychic control over her victim's mind, thereby subverting them to her will. Through unknown means Selene can also cause a human being to become a psychic vampire like herself, but be subordinate to Selene's own will. Selene's youthful appearance and vitality depends upon her absorbing the life forces of one or more people on a regular basis. This restores Selene to a youthful and healthy appearance when she has been injured, or when she over-exerts her other powers, and sustains her centuries-long life. A side effect of this process is that Selene remembers the life of anyone she absorbs.

By using the absorbed life energies that sustain her, Selene can enhance her physical strength, speed, stamina, agility, reflexes, and durability to superhuman levels. The amount of energy she has retained from her victims does seem to correlate somewhat with her physical strength and resistance to injury. Selene can momentarily move at superhuman speeds of around 175 miles/hour, though this requires a heavy expenditure of energy and can cause her to age rapidly and require more life energy immediately. It is not known how often Selene must drain a human's life force in order to survive. Great expenditure of power causes Selene to age rapidly, but she can rejuvenate herself by absorbing more life force.

Selene appears to be immune to most forms of conventional injury; she has survived both a knife wound and a crossbow bolt to her heart with no apparent lasting effects. While not indestructible, she once survived and recovered completely from molecular discorporation, though it took considerable time to reconstitute herself.

Selene is also a powerful telekinetic. Her most direct weapon is the telekinetic power to animate and/or levitate inorganic matter on a molecular level, by projecting part of her absorbed life force into it. She can affect nearly anything within her line of sight, and can warp and alter the molecules of inanimate matter to her whim, causing objects to wrap around and constrict others, creating lifelike humanoid structures to combat her opponents, or simply reducing objects to dust. She can use this power in more standard ways, such as creating powerful force fields around herself, and can levitate herself and others but cannot truly fly. Selene can also control and manipulate fire in a variety of ways, though she cannot create the fire herself; whether this is a facet of her telekinesis or a separate power is unclear.

Selene possesses an undefined level of telepathic ability. Selene has used her abilities to scan minds for information and was able to communicate mentally. She often uses her telepathy to blend her psychic signature into the background thoughts around her, making her difficult for other psionics to locate or track, or to induce a hypnotic trance in others, during which she slips away at superhuman speed, leaving them with the impression that she simply vanished.

Selene is able to temporarily assume the appearance of others. Like many of her other abilities, it is unknown if this is achieved through magic, telepathy, or other means.

Selene possesses considerable magical abilities and extensive knowledge of sorcery, enabling her to cast and counteract spells. While the full extent of Selene's magical skill is not known, her greatly extended lifespan has given her sufficient knowledge and experience to be considered a threat to Kulan Gath. She was able to cast an illusion sufficient to fool Kulan Gath at his most powerful. Selene was revealed by the Eye of Agamotto to be one of several magic-users with the potential to be Doctor Strange's successor as Sorcerer Supreme.

Reception

Accolades 

 In 2017, WhatCulture ranked Selene 6th in their "10 Most Evil X-Men Villains" list.
 In 2019, Screen Rant ranked Selene 7th in their "10 Strongest Female Marvel Villains" list.
 In 2019, CBR.com ranked Selene 2nd in their "X-Men: The 10 Most Powerful Female Villains" list and 14th in their "21 Most Powerful Sorcerer Supreme Candidates" list.
 In 2020, Screen Rant ranked Selene 20th in their "Marvel: 25 Most Powerful Mutants, Ranked From Weakest To Strongest" list.
 In 2021, CBR.com ranked Selene 5th in their "Marvel's 10 Most Powerful Female Mutants" list.
 In 2022, Screen Rant ranked Selene 3rd in their "10 Smartest X-Men Characters" list and included her in their "10 New Characters We Can Hope To See In X-Men ’97" list.

In other media

Television

 Selene appears in Wolverine and the X-Men episode "Foresight" (Part 1), voiced by April Stewart. This version displays psychic vampirism and is a member of the Inner Circle.

Film
 Underworld co-creator Kevin Grevioux confirmed that franchise protagonist Selene is based on Selene Gallio, with Kate Beckinsale further revealing that a crossover film starring her as Selene and Wesley Snipes as Blade had been cancelled in favor of a reboot.
 Selene appears in Dark Phoenix, played by Kota Eberhardt. This version displays telepathic abilities and is a member of Erik Lehnsherr's Brotherhood of Mutants. She and the Brotherhood seek revenge on Jean Grey, only to be captured by the U.S. government. Amidst a D'Bari attack, Selene and fellow Brotherhood member Ariki are killed in battle.

Video games
 Selene appeared as the final boss of Gambit's stage in Spider-Man and the X-Men in Arcade's Revenge.
 Selene appeared as a boss in Wolverine: Adamantium Rage.
 Selene makes a cameo appearance in X-Men Legends II: Rise of Apocalypse, voiced by Jeannie Elias.
 Selene appears in Marvel: Avengers Alliance.

References

External links
 Selene at Marvel.com
 Selene at the Appendix to the Handbook of the Marvel Universe
 
 Selene:The High Priestess
 "Selene - la belle dame sans merci" at UncannyXmen.net
 

Characters created by Chris Claremont
Characters created by Sal Buscema
Comics characters introduced in 1983
Fictional ancient Romans
Fictional characters with immortality
Fictional mass murderers
Marvel Comics characters who can move at superhuman speeds
Marvel Comics characters who have mental powers
Marvel Comics characters who use magic
Marvel Comics female supervillains
Marvel Comics mutants
Marvel Comics telekinetics
Marvel Comics telepaths
Marvel Comics vampires
Selene
X-Men supporting characters